Akbar Turaev (born 27 August 1989) is an Uzbek footballer who currently plays as a goalkeeper for Surkhon Termez.

Career statistics

Club

International

Statistics accurate as of match played 31 March 2015

References

External links
 
 

1989 births
Living people
Association football goalkeepers
Uzbekistani footballers
Uzbekistan international footballers
2015 AFC Asian Cup players
FC Bunyodkor players
FC AGMK players
Navbahor Namangan players
Surkhon Termez players
Uzbekistan Super League players